The 1887 Invercargill mayoral by-election was held on 10 June 1887 to fill the vacancy left by the resignation of David Roche. Aaron Blacke had been appointed mayor by the council, but this was not done in strict accordance with the law, and Blacke is not included in official lists of Mayors of Invercargill.

Edwin Alfred Tapper was elected.

Results
The following table gives the election results:

Notes

References

1887 elections in New Zealand
Mayoral elections in Invercargill